Aasee may refer to:

Aasee College of Education, in the Karur district of Tamil Nadu, India 
Aasee (Münster), a lake in Germany
Aasee (Bocholt), a lake in Germany